Luciano Carty (born 2 October 2001) is a Dutch professional footballer who plays for Cypriot club APEA Akrotiri.

Club career
Carty initially played youth football in his home town of Hoogezand before a switching across to FC Emmen for under-15 level. Carty made his debut for FC Emmen on 19 September 2020 away against PSV Eindhoven. In June 2021 Carty signed a new contract with Emmen keeping him at the club until 2023.

Carty's contract with Emmen was terminated on 30 December 2022.

On 9 January 2023, Carty signed with Cypriot Third Division club APEA Akrotiri.

References

External links
 

2001 births
Footballers from Groningen (city)
Living people
Dutch footballers
Association football forwards
FC Emmen players
Eredivisie players
Eerste Divisie players
Dutch expatriate footballers
Expatriate footballers in Cyprus
Dutch expatriate sportspeople in Cyprus